Carlos Nicolás Gianella (born February 14, 1978 in La Plata) is an Argentine professional basketball player, currently playing for Boca Juniors.

He has played basketball in Argentina, Italy, and Spain

Honours 

Argentina

South American Championships Bronze Medal: 1
2006

Estudiantes Olavarría

LNB: 1
2000

External links
Euroleague Profile
Nicolás Gianella Spanish League Profile 
Italian League Profile 

Argentine men's basketball players
Liga ACB players
1978 births
Living people
Argentine people of Italian descent
Argentine expatriate basketball people in Spain
Sportspeople from La Plata
Estudiantes de Olavarría basketball players
Gimnasia y Esgrima de La Plata basketball players
CB Granada players
Novo Basquete Brasil players
Sociedade Esportiva Palmeiras basketball players
Point guards